Crocus etruscus (Tuscan crocus) is a species of flowering plant in the genus Crocus of the family Iridaceae, endemic to woodlands of Central Tuscany (Italy). The lilac flowers with purple veining and prominent orange stigmas appear in early spring.

Description
Crocus etruscus is a herbaceous perennial geophyte growing from a corm. The corm is globe shaped with a flat top, the tunic is coarsely netted and a secondary star-shaped tunic is produced around the basal plate (where the roots are generated). Flowers are lavender-blue with gray-blue outer surfaces that are marked with dark veining. The three-branched, orange-red stigma is generally taller than the anthers.  Flowering occurs in late winter- early spring. Plants are self-incompatible, meaning that viable seeds are not produced when pollination occurs among flowers of the same corm.  The anthers open up away from the center of the flower to release pollen.

Habitat
It is found growing in sub-Mediterranean deciduous woods and stony fields;  the species may be in bloom from February to April. The specie is almost extinct in the wild. It has a restricted natural range, being endemic to the southwestern part of Tuscany.

In nature the plant has "near-threatened" status.  However, it also appears in cultivation. It has gained the Royal Horticultural Society's Award of Garden Merit.

Cultivars
 Crocus etruscus 'Zwanenburg' is a cultivar with flowers that are pale violet-gray. The flowers have lilac-blue and deep violet-blue striations, with pale yellow throats, and orange anthers.
 Crocus etruscus 'Rosaline' is a cultivar with soft pink flowers.

References

etruscus
Flora of Italy
Plants described in 1860